The Church of Saint Savvas is a Greek Orthodox church and a historical monument located in Chora, on the island of Kythnos, Greece. The church is dedicated to Sabbas the Sanctified.

Location and description 
The church of Agios Savvas is located in Chora, Kythnos. Its construction dates back early early 17th century. It was built at the expenses of Antonios Gozzadinos and bears on the outer façade an inscription dating in 1613 with the coat of arms of the Venetian house of Gozzadini, of which the founder was a descendant. Saint Savvas is a single-aisled, vaulted church with a well-preserved wooden carved altarpiece dating back to around 1640, that seems to have been made specifically for this church.

In 1987 the church has been classified by the Greek Ministry of Culture as a historical monument of the Byzantine/post-Byzantine period. According to the Greek Orthodox Calendar of saints, a celebration dedicated to Saint Savvas takes place every 5 December, which is accompanied by local feast.

References

Bibliography 
 Agnantopoulou, Evangelia (2020). Wood in the cultural heritage of the Cyclades Islands: species, uses, protection. Thessaloniki: Aristotle University Of Thessaloniki (AUTH), Thesis.
 Βάλληνδα, Αντωνίου (1882). Κυθνιακά ήτοι της νήσου Κύθνου χωρογραφία και ιστορία μετά του βίου των συγχρόνων Κυθνίων εν ω ήθη και έθη και γλώσσα και γένη κλπ. Εν Ερμουπόλει: Τυπ. της "Προόδου".

Churches in Greece
Eastern Orthodox church buildings in Greece
Kythnos